In military terms, 89th Division or 89th Infantry Division may refer to:

 Infantry divisions 
89th Division (People's Republic of China)
89th Infantry Division (German Empire)
89th Infantry Division (Germany)
89th Division (Imperial Japanese Army)
89th Rifle Division (Soviet Union)
89th Infantry Division (United States)